The 2019 Fed Cup was the 57th edition of the most important tournament between national teams in women's tennis. 

In one of the biggest shocks in this year's tournament, Romania upset title holders and 11-time winners Czech Republic at Ostrava in the quarterfinals of the competition. Czech Republic was unbeaten at home in the Fed Cup since 2009, when they lost to the United States.

World Group

Seeds

Draw

World Group play-offs

The four losing teams in the World Group first round ties and four winners of the World Group II ties competed in the World Group play-offs.

At the time of the ties taking place, it was expected that the winners would secure a place in the World Group for 2020, while the losers would be relegated to World Group II, in accordance with the existing competition structure.
However, the restructuring of the Fed Cup for 2020 announced on 27 June 2019 stipulated that all eight nations which participated in the World Group play-offs would enter into the 2020 Fed Cup Qualifiers. Consequently, the results of the 2019 World Group play-off ties had no bearing on promotion or relegation for the following year.

Seeds

World Group II

The four winners of World Group II advanced to the World Group play-offs, whereas the four losers played the World Group II play-offs.

Seeds

World Group II play-offs

The four losing teams in the World Group II ties and four winners of the zonal Groups I competed in the World Group II play-offs. 

At the time of the ties taking place, it was expected that the winners would secure a place in the World Group II for 2020, while the losers would be relegated to their respective zonal Group I, in accordance with the existing competition structure. However, the restructuring of the Fed Cup for 2020 announced on 27 June 2019 stipulated that the four winning nations will instead enter the 2020 Fed Cup Qualifiers. Of the four losing nations, the two with the highest ITF Fed Cup Nations Ranking (as of 22 April 2019) will also enter the 2020 Fed Cup Qualifiers, while only the remaining two losing nations will be relegated to their respective zonal Group I.

Seeds

Status of losing teams

The fate of the four losing nations depended on their ITF Fed Cup Nations Ranking as of 22 April 2019.

Americas Zone

Group I 

Venue: Club Campestre Sede Llanogrande, Medellín, Colombia (clay)

Dates: 6–9 February

Participating teams

Pool A

Pool B

Play-offs 

  was promoted to the 2019 Fed Cup World Group II Play-offs.

Group II 
Venue 1: Tennis Club Las Terrazas Miraflores, Lima, Peru (clay)  Venue 2: Centro Nacional de Tenis, Santo Domingo, Dominican Republic (hard)

Dates: 16–20 April

Participating teams

Pool A (Lima)

Pool B (Lima)

Pool A (Santo Domingo)

Play-offs 

Asia/Oceania Zone

Group I 
Venue: Daulet National Tennis Centre, Astana, Kazakhstan (indoor hard)

Dates: 6–9 February

Participating teams

Pool A

Pool B

Pacific Oceania

Play-offs 

  was promoted to the 2019 Fed Cup World Group II Play-offs.
  and Pacific Oceania were relegated to Asia/Oceania Zone Group II in 2020.

Group II 
Venue 1: Pamir Stadium, Dushanbe, Tajikistan (hard) 

Dates: 12–15 June 

Venue 2: National Tennis Centre, Kuala Lumpur, Malaysia (hard) 

Dates: 19–23 June

Participating teams

Pool A (Dushanbe)

Pool B (Dushanbe)

Pool A (Kuala Lumpur)

Pool B (Kuala Lumpur)

Play-offs 

Europe/Africa Zone

Group I 
Venue 1: Hala Widowiskowo-Sportowa, Zielona Góra, Poland (indoor hard)  Venue 2: University of Bath, Bath, United Kingdom (indoor hard)

Dates: 6–9 February

Participating teams

Pool A (Zielona Góra)
 
 
 

Pool B (Zielona Góra)
 
 
 
 

Pool A (Bath)
 
 
  
 

Pool B (Bath)

Play-offs 

Group II 
Venue: Centre National de Tennis, Esch-sur-Alzette, Luxembourg (indoor hard)

Dates: 6–9 February

Participating teams

Pool A

Pool B

Play-offs 

Group III 
Venue 1: Tali Tennis Center, Helsinki, Finland (indoor hard)  Venue 2: Ulcinj Bellevue, Ulcinj, Montenegro (clay)

Dates: 15–20 April

Participating teams

Pool A (Helsinki)

Pool B (Helsinki)

Pool A (Ulcinj)

Pool B (Ulcinj)

Play-offs 

References

External links 
 fedcup.com

 
2019
2019 in women's tennis